Cleve "Cal" Langford (born March 18, 1959) is a Canadian bobsledder who competed from the late 1980s to the late 1990s. Competing in two Winter Olympics, he earned his best finish of fourth in the four-man event at Albertville in 1992. Langford was born  in Winnipeg, Manitoba.

References
 1988 bobsleigh four-man results
 1992 bobsleigh four-man results
Missing Canadian Olympians - 1988 games in Calgary and Seoul
Missing Canadian Olympians - 1992 games in Albertville and Barcelona

1959 births
Sportspeople from Winnipeg
Bobsledders at the 1988 Winter Olympics
Bobsledders at the 1992 Winter Olympics
Canadian male bobsledders
Olympic bobsledders of Canada
Living people